The women's 4 × 100 metres relay at the 2016 IPC Athletics European Championships were held at the Stadio Olimpico Carlo Zecchini in Grosseto from 11 to 16 June.

Medalists

See also
List of IPC world records in athletics

References

4 x 100 metres relay
2016 in women's athletics